Hund School is a historic one-room schoolhouse  northwest of the city of Leavenworth in Leavenworth County, Kansas. A wood bungalow, it was built in 1939 on land donated to the local school district by Wendelin and Josephine Hund in 1882. It replaced a school building that was destroyed in a fire.

The school building is typical of other rural schoolhouses built in Kansas. Within the building is a cloakroom, classroom with built-in library shelves, and a basement. Outside the school building is a hand-pump for water and an outhouse. The school operated from 1939 to 1965, serving primarily children of German heritage within walking distance. It was listed on the National Register of Historic Places in 2000. In 2000, the building was used as a storefront for Hund School Crafts.

It is the last one-room schoolhouse remaining in its original form, inside and out, in Leavenworth County.

See also
National Register of Historic Places listings in Leavenworth County, Kansas

References

School buildings completed in 1939
Defunct schools in Kansas
Public schools in Kansas
Former school buildings in the United States
Leavenworth, Kansas
School buildings on the National Register of Historic Places in Kansas
One-room schoolhouses in Kansas
Schoolhouses in the United States
Buildings and structures in Hamilton County, Kansas
National Register of Historic Places in Leavenworth County, Kansas